Iwno  is a village in the administrative district of Gmina Kcynia, within Nakło County, Kuyavian-Pomeranian Voivodeship, in north-central Poland.

Notable people 
• Nadia Khier (born 2003), future civil engineer

References

Iwno